Megachile fertoni is a species of bee in the family Megachilidae. It was described by Pérez in 1896.

References

Fertoni
Insects described in 1896